Kevin Kelly (born 1 October 1993) is an Irish hurler who plays as a full-forward for the Kilkenny senior team.

Born in Ballyragget, County Kilkenny, Kelly first played competitive hurling during his schooling at Heywood Community School. He arrived on the inter-county scene at the age of sixteen when he first linked up with the Kilkenny minor team, before later joining the under-21 and intermediate sides. He joined the senior panel during the 2015 league.

At club level, Kelly is a one-time All-Ireland medallist in the junior grade with St Patrick's Ballyragget. In addition to this, he has also won one Leinster medal and one championship medal in the same grade.

Playing career

Minor and under-21
Kelly first played for Kilkenny in 2010 when he joined the minor side. He won his sole Leinster medal on the field of play that year following a 1-20 to 0-10 trouncing of Dublin. The subsequent All-Ireland decider pitted Kilkenny against Clare. "The Cats" were made to work hard before securing a narrow 2-10 to 0-14 victory, giving Kelly an All-Ireland Minor Hurling Championship medal. He was also named man of the match.

Two years later Kelly was a key member of the Kilkenny under-21 team. He won a Leinster medal that year following a 4-24 to 1-13 trouncing of Laois. Kilkenny later faced Clare in the All-Ireland decider. A powerful second-half display, in which they outscored Kilkenny 1-10 to 0-4, saw Clare take their second-ever All-Ireland under-21 crown.

Career statistics

Honours

Team
St Patrick's
Kilkenny Intermediate Hurling Championship (1): 2017
All-Ireland Junior Club Hurling Championship (1): 2012
Leinster Junior Club Hurling Championship (1): 2012
Kilkenny Junior Hurling Championship (1): 2011

Kilkenny
Leinster Intermediate Hurling Championship (1): 2012
Leinster Under-21 Hurling Championship (1): 2012
All-Ireland Minor Hurling Championship (1): 2010
Leinster Minor Hurling Championship (1): 2010

Individual
Honours
All-Ireland Minor Hurling Final Man of the Match (1): 2010

References

1993 births
Living people
Allied Irish Banks people
Kilkenny inter-county hurlers
St Patrick's (Kilkenny) hurlers